Breakish may refer to: 
Lower Breakish, Isle of Skye, Scotland
Upper Breakish, Isle of Skye, Scotland